"All Summer Long" is a song by American recording artist Kid Rock. It was released in March 2008 as the third single from his seventh studio album, Rock n Roll Jesus (2007). It was inspired by Bob Seger's song "Night Moves", and also samples "Sweet Home Alabama" by Lynyrd Skynyrd and "Werewolves of London" by Warren Zevon.

"All Summer Long" was a number-one hit in Australia and six countries across Europe, including the United Kingdom. In the United States, it crossed over to country radio, giving Kid Rock his first top-10 country hit. Kid Rock performed the song at the 2009 Grammy Awards and at WrestleMania 25, both in medleys. He also promoted the song in Europe performing at the MTV Europe Music Awards and the World Music Awards. The song led to the TV special VH-1 Storytellers in November 2008.

Background
Mike E. Clark was working with both Insane Clown Posse and Kid Rock at the same time when he developed the initial track that became "All Summer Long", and listened to music on his iPod as a source of inspiration. By this point, he no longer wanted to use samples in his production. Joseph Bruce from Insane Clown Posse was a huge fan of "Werewolves of London" by Warren Zevon, so Clark had the song on his iPod, and when listening to his iPod on shuffle, Clark decided that he had to create a track sampling the song. Clark added several other elements, including a snare drum from a drum machine that Kid Rock later told Clark that he loved because it was the same brand of drum machine used on Michael Jackson's "Beat It". Clark labeled the compact disc containing the unfinished track as "Werewolf Bite" and initially planned to use it on a free single which would be released to that year's Gathering of the Juggalos, but decided to play it for Kid Rock, who was unimpressed by the track, even though Clark loved it. Later, Kid Rock insisted that Clark play the track again, and Kid Rock later came up with the idea to do a mashup of "Werewolves of London" and Lynyrd Skynyrd's "Sweet Home Alabama" and add a new melody, resulting in the new composition "All Summer Long". Clark was not credited for production on the song.

Eight people are credited for writing "All Summer Long": the songwriters of "Werewolves of London" (Leroy Marinell, Waddy Wachtel and Warren Zevon), the songwriters of "Sweet Home Alabama" (Ed King, Gary Rossington and Ronnie Van Zant), Matthew Shafer (Uncle Kracker), and Robert Ritchie (Kid Rock).

Chart performance
"All Summer Long" was Kid Rock's fourth song to chart on the Billboard Hot 100, becoming his third top-40 hit on the Hot 100 and the biggest solo hit of his career. It reached number 23 on the Hot 100 based solely on airplay, since Kid Rock had not made his catalog available for legal digital download at the time (therefore, the song received no digital sales). It also became a pop crossover hit, reaching the top 10 on the Mainstream Top 40 chart. "All Summer Long" has also reached the top 10 on Billboards Adult Top 40.

The song was Kid Rock's third entry on the Billboard Hot Country Songs chart, after "Picture" and "Single Father" in 2003, reaching number four to become his first top-20 and top-10 single on that chart. It was a moderate hit on American rock radio, peaking at number 17 on the Mainstream Rock Tracks chart and number 38 on the Modern Rock Tracks chart. The song has sold 943,000 copies in the US as of April 2016.

"All Summer Long" is Kid Rock's first international hit as well. In the United Kingdom, the song peaked atop the UK Singles Chart on the week of August 2, 2008, which was its only week at number one. In the rest of Europe, the song was available as a physical and digital release and topped the charts of Ireland, Austria, Germany, the Netherlands, and Switzerland. It reached the top five in Flanders, Norway, and Sweden. In addition, it topped the European Hot 100 Singles chart for four weeks, ending 2008 as Europe's eighth-most-successful single. In Australia, the song was his first top-10 hit and number-one single, while in New Zealand, the song peaked at number three.

Music video
The music video for the song was shot in Nashville, Tennessee, and features Kid Rock driving a Grand Craft Grand Sport boat out on the Old Hickory Lake, while two teenagers are shown enacting the song's lyrics, taking place in the implied year of 1989 as mentioned in the first verse. Kid Rock is also shown partying with girls or women on a different boat, and singing the song on a platform on the lake during night time. The platform, float & lights are a homage to the "Playboy girls" scene in the film Apocalypse Now. As the video ends, the small boat Kid Rock is driving can be seen with the word "cowboy" on the back.

Track listing
 "All Summer Long"
 "Son of Detroit" (live)
 "Bawitdaba" (live)

Charts

Weekly charts

Year-end charts

Decade-end charts

Certifications

Release history

Hit Masters version

A recording of the song was released digitally by Hit Masters, a karaoke company whose version was made available in the iTunes Store in North America.  Due to Kid Rock's decision to withhold his music from the iTunes market, sales from the karaoke version eventually caused it to overtake Kid Rock's original on the Billboard Hot 100 in the United States peaking at number 19.  This version also peaked at number 28 on the Canadian Hot 100 due to digital downloads. As Rock's version remained in the top 30 based on radio airplay alone, Hit Masters jumped into the top 20 due to its sales strength.  However, the radio success of "All Summer Long" propelled Rock N Roll Jesus back up to number two on the Billboard 200, nearly a year after its release.

Charts

The Rock Heroes version

Another recording of the song by karaoke band the Rock Heroes was released on iTunes for digital downloads in North America in September 2008. In the U.S. it debuted at number 38 on the Billboard Hot 100 and then rose to number 29 the next week, and also in Canada it debuted at number 16 on the Canadian Hot 100 due to digital downloads.

Charts

See also
List of number-one singles in Australia in 2008
List of number-one hits of 2008 (Austria)
List of European number-one hits of 2008
List of number-one hits of 2008 (Germany)
List of number-one singles of 2008 (Ireland)
List of number-one hits of 2008 (Switzerland)
List of number-one singles from the 2000s (UK)
List of UK Rock Chart number-one singles of 2008

References

2007 songs
2008 singles
Atlantic Records singles
European Hot 100 Singles number-one singles
Irish Singles Chart number-one singles
Kid Rock songs
Music videos directed by Deaton-Flanigen Productions
Number-one singles in Australia
Number-one singles in Austria
Number-one singles in Germany
Number-one singles in Scotland
Number-one singles in Switzerland
Songs about alcohol
Songs about Michigan
Songs about music
Songs about nostalgia
Songs written by Gary Rossington
Songs written by Kid Rock
Songs written by Uncle Kracker
Songs written by Warren Zevon
UK Singles Chart number-one singles